Lapeer High School is a coeducational public high school located in Lapeer, Michigan. It was established in 2014 following a merger of two high schools.  LHS has the largest enrollment of any school in Central Michigan or The Thumb.

History
Lapeer High School existed as one school until the 1975–1976 school year, when growing enrollments caused the need for an additional high school building. As a result, Lapeer High School was split into two: Lapeer West High School and Lapeer East High School

In March 2013, the Lapeer School Board voted to consolidate the two high schools in Lapeer.  The board decided to act sooner rather than later in addressing long-term structural issues plaguing the community - lower birth rates, declining population, and reduced funding due to current and projected enrollment declines. Over the previous 30 years, both high schools saw enrollments decline by about 15%.

Lapeer High School was established in 2014 in the former Lapeer East building, which was renovated in summer 2013 to accommodate in the increase in enrollment, which as of 2014 stood at 2,112. The Lapeer West building now houses alternative education and other educational programs.  Prior to consolidation, each high school had an enrollment of approximately 1,100 students.

Athletics
Lapeer High School competes in the Saginaw Valley League, a 14-school conference that mostly serves a large geographical area of Central Michigan, specifically the Flint/Tri-Cities area.  Prior to consolidation, both Lapeer East and Lapeer West were original members of the Flint Metro League since its founding in 1968.  With the announcement of the planned consolidation of Lapeer East and West High Schools, and subsequent denial of membership to the Flint Metro League (based upon LHS's new larger enrollment), district officials began a thorough process to determine new league affiliation with input from students, coaches, and parents.  Additional options besides SVC included the Oakland Activities Association, the Macomb Area Conference, and competing as an independent school. LHS is in the South Division of the SVL, competing against schools in the Flint area.

Prior to opening, a committee of teachers and students from both schools decided on the schools new mascot and colors. They chose "Lightning" as the mascot and blue and green as the colors.  The colors pay homage to the past of both former schools: navy blue from Lapeer West and kelly green from Lapeer East.

As the former East and West High Schools were rivals of one another, and with the move to a new athletic conference, LHS lacks a natural rivalry. Past non-conference opponents that LHS will now play regularly include the Flint schools and Davison High School.

Notable alumni
 Kelly Best (West), Miss Michigan USA, 2007
 Larry Carney (East), children's author and songwriter
 Louis C. Cramton (LHS), politician and judge
 Danelle Gay (West), Miss Michigan USA, 2006
 Roger Kish (West), head wrestling coach at North Dakota State University
 Terry Knight (LHS), rock and roll music producer and promoter for Grand Funk Railroad
 Jake Long (East), professional football player
 Joe Long (East), professional football player
 Asya Miller (East), blind athlete, goalball competitor
 Terry Nichols (LHS), convicted accomplice in the Oklahoma City bombing
 Glenn Pakulak (East), former professional football player
 Charles E. Potter, (LHS), former U.S. Representative and U.S. Senator serving Michigan
 Victor Prather (LHS), former flight surgeon and space suit designer
 Kemp Rasmussen (West), former professional football player

References

External links
 

Public high schools in Michigan
1922 establishments in Michigan
Schools in Lapeer County, Michigan